This is a list of species that are native to the U.S. state of Washington.

Plants sorted by family

Adoxaceae
 Sambucus nigra ― blue elderberry
 Sambucus racemosa ― red elderberry
 Viburnum edule ― high-bush cranberry
 Viburnum ellipticum ― common viburnum
 Viburnum opulus ― snowball viburnum

Asparagaceae
 Asparagus officinalis ― garden asparagus 
 Brodiaea coronaria ― bluedick brodiea
 Camassia quamash ― common camas 
 Camassia leichtlinii ― large camas
 Dichelostemma congestum ― ookow, northern saitas
 Maianthemum dilatatum ― false lily-of-the-valley
 Maianthemum racemosum ― feathery false lily-of-the-valley
 Maianthemum stellatum ― starry false lily-of-the-valley
 Muscari armeniacum ― garden grape-hyacinth 
 Ornithogalum umbellatum ― sleepydick 
 Triteleia grandiflora ― blue umber lily
 Triteleia hyacinthina ― white triteleia

Athyriaceae
 Athyrium filix-femina — common lady fern

Berberidaceae

 Achlys californica — vanillaleaf
 Achlys triphylla — vanillaleaf
 Berberis nervosa — dwarf Oregon-grape

 Mahonia aquifolium — Oregon-grape
 Vancouveria hexandra — white inside-out flower

Betulaceae

 Alnus incana — mountain alder
 Alnus rhombifolia — white alder
 Alnus rubra — red alder
 Alnus viridis — Siberian alder, Sitka alder, mountain alder
 Betula glandulosa — swamp birch

 Betula occidentalis — water birch, river birch
 Betula papyrifera — paper birch
 Betula pumila — bog birch, dwarf birch
 Corylus cornuta — California hazel, beaked hazel

Blechnaceae
 Blechnum spicant — deer fern

Boraginaceae
 Hydrophyllum tenuipes — Pacific waterleaf

Caprifoliaceae
 Symphoricarpos albus — snowberry, waxberry

Cannabaceae
 Celtis reticulata — western hackberry/netleaf hackberry

Cornaceae

 Cornus nuttallii — Pacific dogwood
 Cornus sericea — creek dogwood

 Cornus × unalaschkensis — western bunchberry

Cupressaceae

 Cupressus nootkatensis — Nootka cypress
 Juniperus communis — common juniper
 Juniperus maritima — seaside juniper

 Juniperus occidentalis — western juniper
 Juniperus scopulorum — Rocky Mountain juniper
 Thuja plicata — western redcedar

Cyperaceae
 Schoenoplectus acutus — tule

Dryopteridaceae
 Polystichum munitum — western sword fern

Ericaceae

 Arbutus menziesii — Pacific madrona
 Arctostaphylos uva-ursi — kinnickinnick
 Gaultheria shallon — salal

 Rhododendron macrophyllum — Pacific rhododendron
 Vaccinium ovatum — evergreen huckleberry
 Vaccinium parvifolium — red huckleberry

Fagaceae
 Chrysolepis chrysophylla — golden chinquapin
 Quercus garryana — Oregon white oak

Hydrangeaceae
 Philadelphus lewisii — Lewis's mock-orange

Liliaceae
 Clintonia uniflora ― bead lily, queen's cup
 Erythronium grandiflorum ― yellow glacier lily
 Erythronium oregonum ― white fawn lily
 Erythronium revolutum — pink fawn lily

Oleaceae
 Fraxinus latifolia — Oregon ash

Orchidaceae
 Goodyera oblongifolia — rattlesnake plantain

Paeoniaceae
 Paeonia brownii — native peony

Papaveraceae
 Dicentra formosa — Pacific bleeding heart

Pinaceae

 Abies amabilis — Pacific silver fir
 Abies grandis — grand fir
 Abies lasiocarpa — subalpine fir
 Abies procera — noble fir
 Larix lyallii — alpine larch
 Larix occidentalis — western larch
 Picea engelmannii — Engelmann spruce
 Picea glauca — white spruce, western white spruce

 Picea sitchensis — Sitka spruce
 Pinus albicaulis — whitebark pine
 Pinus contorta — lodgepole pine
 Pinus monticola — western white pine
 Pinus ponderosa — ponderosa pine
 Pseudotsuga menziesii — Douglas fir
 Tsuga heterophylla — western hemlock
 Tsuga mertensiana — mountain hemlock

Plantaginaceae

 Penstemon acuminatus — sharpleaf penstemon
 Penstemon barrettiae — Barrett's beardtongue
 Penstemon cardwellii — T.J. Howell Cardwell's beardtongue

 Penstemon palmeri — Palmer's penstemon
 Penstemon rupicola — cliff beardtongue

Polypodiaceae
 Polypodium glycyrrhiza — licorice fern

Ranunculaceae 
 Actaea rubra ― baneberry
 Anemone deltoidea ― three-leaved anemone, Pacific white anemone, Columbian windflower
 Anemone multifida ― cut-leaf anemone
 Anemone occidentalis ― western anemone, white pasqueflower
 Aquilegia formosa ― red columbine
 Caltha biflora ― two-flowered marsh marigold
 Caltha leptosepala ― white marsh marigold
 Coptis asplenifolia ― fern-leaved goldthread
 Delphinium menziesii ― Menzie's larkspur
 Ranunculus eschscholtzii ― Eschscholtz's buttercup
 Ranunculus flammula ― lesser spearwort, creeping spearwort, banewort
 Ranunculus occidentalis ― western buttercup
 Ranunculus uncinatus ― little buttercup
 Thalictrum occidentale ― western meadowrue
 Trautvetteria caroliniensis ― false bugbane
 Trollius laxus ― globeflower

Rhamnaceae
 Rhamnus purshiana — cascara buckthorn

Rosaceae
 Amelanchier alnifolia ― saskatoon, Pacific serviceberry
 Aruncus dioicus — goat's beard
 Geum calthifolium ―  caltha-leaved avens
 Geum macrophyllum ― large-leaved avens
 Leutkea pectinata ― partridgefoot
 Oemleria cerasiformis — osoberry
 Physocarpus capitatus — Pacific ninebark
 Potentilla anserina ― silverweed
 Potentilla flabellifolia ― fan-leaved cinquefoil
 Potentilla villosa ― villous cinquefoil
 Rosa nutkana — Nootka rose
 Rubus parviflorus — thimbleberry
 Rubus spectabilis — salmonberry
 Rubus ursinus — trailing blackberry, California dewberry
 Sanguisorba canadensis ― Sitka burnet
 Sanguisorba officinales ― great burnet
 Sibbaldia procumbens ― sibbaldia

Salicaceae

 Populus tremuloides — quaking aspen
 Populus trichocarpa — black cottonwood
 Salix amygdaloides — peach-leaf willow
 Salix arctica — Arctic willow
 Salix barclayi — Barclay's willow
 Salix bebbiana — gray willow, Bebb's willow, long-beak willow
 Salix boothii — Booth's willow
 Salix brachycarpa — small-fruit willow
 Salix candida — sage willow
 Salix cascadensis — Cascade willow
 Salix columbiana — Columbia River willow
 Salix commutata — under-green willow
 Salix drummondiana — Drummond's willow
 Salix eastwoodiae — Sierra willow
 Salix exigua — narrow-leaf willow, coyote willow
 Salix farriae — Farr's willow
 Salix fragilis — crack willow
 Salix geyeriana — Geyer's willow

 Salix glauca — gray willow
 Salix hookeriana — coastal willow
 Salix lasiandra — Pacific willow
 Salix lasiolepis — arroyo willow
 Salix maccalliana — Maccalla's willow
 Salix melanopsis — dusky willow
 Salix monochroma — one-color willow
 Salix nivalis — dwarf snow willow
 Salix pedicellaris — bog willow
 Salix petrophila — alpine willow
 Salix planifolia — tea-leaved willow
 Salix prolixa — Mackenzie's willow
 Salix pseudomonticola — false mountain willow
 Salix scouleriana — Scouler's willow
 Salix sessilifolia — sessile-leaf willow
 Salix sitchensis — Sitka willow
 Salix tweedyi — Tweedy's willow
 Salix vestita — rock willow

Sapindaceae

 Acer circinatum — vine maple
 Acer glabrum — Douglas maple

 Acer macrophyllum — big-leaf maple

Saxifragaceae 
 Boykinia occidentalis ― coast boykinia, western boykinia
 Chrysosplenium glechomifolium ― Pacific golden saxifrage
 Heuchera glabra ― smooth alumroot
 Heuchera micrantha ― small-flowered alumroot
 Leptarrhena pyrolifolia ― leatherleaf saxifrage
 Lithophragma parviflorum ― small-flowered woodland star
 Micranthes ferruginea ― Alaska saxifrage
 Micranthes occidentalis ― western saxifrage
 Micranthes tolmiei ― Tolmie's saxifrage
 Mitella breweri ― brewer's mitrewort
 Mitella pentandra ― five-stamened mitrewort
 Saxifraga bronchialis ― spotted saxifrage, prickly saxifrage
 Saxifraga cespitosa ― tufted saxifrage
 Saxifraga oppositifolia ― purple mountain saxifrage
 Tellima grandiflora ― fringecup
 Tiarella trifoliata ― foamflower
 Tolmiea menziesii ―  piggy-back plant, youth-on-age

Taxaceae
 Taxus brevifolia — Pacific yew

Tofieldiaceae
 Triantha occidentalis — western false asphodel

Zosteraceae
 Zostera marina — marine eelgrass

See also

 List of fauna of Washington (state)

References

 Burke Museum (WTU) Image Collection

External links
Washington Flora Checklist

 
Washington
Flora
Washington